Dimitris Minasidis (born April 29, 1989) is a Cypriot weightlifter. Minasidis represented Cyprus at the 2008 Summer Olympics in Beijing, where he competed for the men's lightweight category (69 kg). Minasidis placed twentieth in this event, as he successfully lifted 128 kg in the single-motion snatch, and hoisted 155 kg in the two-part, shoulder-to-overhead clean and jerk, for a total of 283 kg.

References

External links
NBC 2008 Olympics profile

Cypriot male weightlifters
1989 births
Living people
Olympic weightlifters of Cyprus
Weightlifters at the 2008 Summer Olympics
Weightlifters at the 2014 Commonwealth Games
Commonwealth Games gold medallists for Cyprus
Commonwealth Games medallists in weightlifting
Mediterranean Games silver medalists for Cyprus
Mediterranean Games medalists in weightlifting
Competitors at the 2009 Mediterranean Games
European Weightlifting Championships medalists
21st-century Cypriot people
Medallists at the 2014 Commonwealth Games